Vedano may refer to the following places in Italy:

Vedano al Lambro, comune in the Province of Monza and Brianza
Vedano Olona, comune in the Province of Varese